Judvan Lucas de Almeida (born 2 August 1991) is a Brazilian footballer who plays as a midfielder for Brazilian club Taguatinga.

References

1991 births
Living people
Brazilian footballers
Sportspeople from Piauí
Association football midfielders
Sociedade Esportiva do Gama players
Dorados de Sinaloa footballers
Ceilândia Esporte Clube players
Brasília Futebol Clube players
Associação Atlética Anapolina players
Campeonato Brasileiro Série D players
Ascenso MX players
Brazilian expatriate footballers
Expatriate footballers in Mexico
Brazilian expatriate sportspeople in Mexico